Westwind is a 1990 novel written by Ian Rankin, and is one of the author's earliest works.

Plot summary
The Zephyr computer system monitors the progress of the United Kingdom's only spy satellite. When this system briefly goes offline, the book's main characters Hepton and Dreyfuss (the sole survivor of a space shuttle crash) have the only key to the enigma that must be solved if both men are to stay alive.

Release details
1991, UK, Ulverscroft Large Print Books Ltd; Large Print Ed edition (September 1991), hardback (First edition)  Hardcover: 480 pages
The book was reissued, with slight modifications, in November 2019.

References

Bibliography

1991 British novels
Novels by Ian Rankin
Barrie & Jenkins books